Taillefer is originally an Old French nickname (from the medieval Latin incisor ferri or sector ferri, meaning "hewer of iron"). It may refer to:

Taillefer, an eleventh-century Norman juggler and singer.
the Taillefer Rocks, small Tasmanian granite islands
the Massif du Taillefer in the Dauphiné Alps
Le Taillefer, highest peak in the Massif du Taillefer
The House of Taillefer was the first dynasty of Counts of Angoulême (839–1246)
Taillefer (Strauss), a cantata for choir, soloists and orchestra written by German composer Richard Strauss in 1903

People with the surname
Jean Taillefer (1869–1941), French fencer
Germaine Tailleferre born Marcelle Germaine Taillefesse (1892–1983), French composer

See also
William Taillefer (disambiguation), several medieval rulers had this name
Telfer (disambiguation), Scottish surname based on Taillefer
Taliaferro, a Virginian family